2EC is a radio station broadcasting to the South Coast of New South Wales, Australia, specifically the local government areas of Eurobodalla and Bega Valley. It is owned by East Coast Radio Pty. Ltd, which is a subsidiary of ARN.

History 
2BE began test broadcasting in February 1937. The station was officially opened on 30 September 1937.

In November 2021, 2EC, along with other stations owned by Grant Broadcasters, were acquired by the Australian Radio Network. This deal will allow Grant's stations, including 2EC, to access ARN's iHeartRadio platform in regional areas. The deal was finalized on January 4, 2022. It is expected 2EC will integrate with ARN's Pure Gold Network, but will retain its current name according to the press release from ARN.

Frequencies 
765 AM- Bega Valley and surrounds. Can be heard throughout most of the coverage area, and along the coastline for great distances. Transmitter is located at Kalaru  Note: This AM service is scheduled to be decommissioned in March 2021 and is being replaced by a new service on 94.5 FM.
94.5 FM- Bega Valley and surrounds. Transmitting from Mt Mumbulla @ ~5Kw ERP with an Omnidirectional radiation pattern. Primary coverage area is the Bega Valley, Tathra, Bermagui, Wolumla and surrounding areas. This FM service was commissioned in February 2021 and replaces the above 765 AM service.
105.5 FM- Eden and surrounds. Transmitting 1 kW from Bimmil Hill near Eden  the translator covers Merimbula, Eden and Mallacoota (VIC) adequately. In exceptional atmospheric conditions, this transmitter can cover much of the 2EC license area, and has been heard as far north as Sydney.
105.9 FM- Eurobodalla, plus some towns in the southern Shoalhaven such as Bawley Point and Lake Tabourie. Transmits at 20 kW (directional pattern) from Mt. Wandera west of Moruya  In good atmospheric conditions, the transmitter can be heard in the Bega Valley region, as well as north to the Shoalhaven and Illawarra. The transmission has been heard as far north as Buladelah on the NSW north coast.

Programming 
The station airs a classic hits format, with the same playlist as other stations part of the ARN Regional Pure Gold Network.

In contrast to many radio stations in regional Australia, 2EC airs very little networked programming. A strong focus is on the community, with segments such as Lost and Found, Job file and Community Contact featured throughout the day. Discussions about local events and issues are held regularly, with strong local news heard most hours.

The 2EC morning show often speaks to key local people such as Bega MP Andrew Constance.

The radio station has a very local feel, which is also incorporated with their websites, www.2ec.com.au and www.guidetofarsouthcoast.com.au

On air lineup (weekdays) 
Kimmi Saker- 6 am to 9am)
Bertie- 9am to 12pm 
The Run Home With Tim- 2 pm to 6 pm
20 20 Retro Countdown with Aaron Stevens- 6pm - 8pm

Weekend programming includes "The Best of Kimmi Saker", The Locker Room, Real Estate Show. The station is unique in NSW in that it takes both NRL and AFL coverage, possibly owing to its position near the Victorian border. AFL is heard Saturday afternoon from midday, whilst NRL is covered Friday night, Saturday night and Sunday afternoons with the 2EC Continuous Call Team. And not much else

Affiliations 
 Croc Media (AFL coverage)
 2GB Sydney (NRL coverage)

Power FM South Coast is a sister station, playing contemporary hit music.

References 

 New and improved radio services in the Bega region – Press release from The Australian Broadcasting Authority – 7 August 2004
 2EC Website
 2EC Radio Live
 East Coast Radio

Radio stations in New South Wales
Radio stations established in 1937
Classic hits radio stations in Australia
Australian Radio Network
South Coast (New South Wales)